Anita Stewart Morris (August 7, 1886 – September 15, 1977) was an American socialite and heiress who married Prince Miguel, Duke of Viseu, grandson of King Miguel I of Portugal, and the eldest son of Dom Miguel, Duke of Braganza, who was Miguelist claimant to the throne of Portugal from 1866 to 1920.

Early life
Anita Rhinelander Stewart was born in Elberon, New Jersey, on August 7, 1886. She was the daughter of Anne "Annie" McKee Armstrong (1864–1925) and William Rhinelander Stewart, Sr. (1852–1929). She had one sibling, William Rhinelander Stewart, Jr.  Her father was an attorney who managed several trusts for his family. Her parents divorced in August 1906, and afterwards, her mother married James Henry Smith. Smith died in Japan in 1907 while on their honeymoon.  Her mother then married Jean de Saint Cyr on April 25, 1915.

Her paternal grandparents were Lispenard Stewart (1809–1867) and Mary Rogers (née Rhinelander) Stewart (1821–1893). Her uncle was New York State Senator Lispenard Stewart (1855–1927). Her maternal grandparents were John Armstrong (1823–1884) and Margaretta (née McKee) Armstrong (1833–1900), daughter of William McKee and Ann (née Alricks) McKee.

Career
After her husband died in 1923, Anita moved to New York City. In order to regain her American citizenship, she had to renounce her royal title. However, society continued to refer to her with her regal title.

Following her second marriage, she continued to operate a photography studio in Manhattan and spend time at Malbone, their Gothic Revival estate in Newport, Rhode Island.

Personal life
On September 15, 1909, Stewart married Prince Miguel, Duke of Viseu (1878–1923) at St. Lawrence's Catholic Church in Dingwall, Scotland, with the reception at Dingwall Castle.  On September 6, a week preceding her wedding, Franz Joseph I, the Emperor of Austria, bestowed the title of Prinzessin von Braganza (Princess of Braganza), on her.  Her husband was the eldest son of Infante Miguel, Duke of Braganza and Princess Elisabeth of Thurn and Taxis. In order to get the consent of his father to marry Anita, Dom Miguel had to renounce all claim to the throne of Portugal in favor of his younger brother, Prince Francis Joseph. Out of this union, three children were born, all of whom used the title Prince or Princess until 1920, when their parents' marriage was deemed to be in contravention of royal law:

Isabel Maria "Nadejda" de Bragança (1910–1946), who married Wlodzimierz "Vadim" Dorozynski in Capri, Italy on August 16, 1930. They divorced in 1932 and in 1942, she married René Millet.
John de Bragança (1912–1991), who married Winifred Dodge Seyburn in 1948. They divorced in 1953 and in 1971, he was married to Katharine (née King) Bahnson (1921–2007).
Miguel de Bragança (1915–1996), a St. George School graduate who married Anne Hughson in 1946.

In 1946, Anita married Lewis Gouverneur Morris (1882–1967), the son of Francis Morris and Harriet Hall (née Bedlow) Morris, in New York City.

Anita died at the age of 91, on September 15, 1977, at her home in Newport, Rhode Island.

References

External links

 Anita Rhinelander Stewart at Mrs. Astor and the Gilded Age.

1886 births
1977 deaths
American socialites
House of Braganza
People from Long Branch, New Jersey